St Peter and St Paul's Church, Syston is a Grade I listed parish church in the Church of England in Syston, Leicestershire.

History

The earliest parts of the church date from the 13th century.

The nave and tower were restored by Frederick Webster Ordish of Queniborough at a cost of £1,600 and reopened in February 1872

The chancel was replaced in 1880 at a cost of £2,300. Duston stone was used for the walls with Clipstone and Bath stone for the pillars and corbels. The floor was laid with Portland and red Mansfield stone, the aisles being laid with Staffordshire quarries. The carving was done by Thomas Earp of London. It re-opened on 27 May 1881.

Organ

The organ dates from 1887 and is by Taylor of Leicester A specification of the organ can be found on the National Pipe Organ Register.

Parish status
The church is part of The Fosse Team which comprises the following churches
St Mary's Church, Barkby
St Hilda's Church, East Goscote
Holy Trinity Church, Thrussington
St Botolph's Church, Ratcliffe-on-the-Wreake
St Michael and All Angels’ Church, Rearsby
St Mary's Church, Queniborough
St Michael and All Angels’ Church, Thurmaston

References

13th-century church buildings in England
Church of England church buildings in Leicestershire
Grade I listed churches in Leicestershire